Mokry Dwór may refer to the following places in Poland:
Mokry Dwór, Lower Silesian Voivodeship (south-west Poland)
Mokry Dwór, Pomeranian Voivodeship (north Poland)